Teppozu Inari Shrine is an Inari shrine in Chūō, Tokyo, Japan.

External links

 

Buildings and structures in Chūō, Tokyo
Inari shrines
Shinto shrines in Tokyo